Curtis Tracy McMullen (born May 21, 1958) is an American mathematician who is the Cabot Professor of Mathematics at Harvard University.  He was awarded the Fields Medal in 1998 for his work in complex dynamics, hyperbolic geometry and Teichmüller theory.

Biography

McMullen graduated as valedictorian in 1980 from Williams College and obtained his PhD in 1985 from  Harvard University, supervised by Dennis Sullivan.  He held post-doctoral positions at the Massachusetts Institute of Technology, the Mathematical Sciences Research Institute, and the Institute for Advanced Study, after which he was on the faculty at Princeton University (1987–1990) and the University of California, Berkeley (1990–1997), before joining Harvard in 1997.
McMullen was chair of the Harvard Mathematics Department from 2017 to 2020. He was the doctoral advisor of Maryam Mirzakhani who won the Fields Medal as the first female in history.

Honors and awards
McMullen received the Salem Prize in 1991 and won the Fields Medal in 1998 at the International Congress of Mathematicians (ICM) in Berlin. At the 1990 ICM in Kyoto he was an Invited Speaker. He was awarded a Guggenheim Fellowship in 2004, elected to the National Academy of Sciences in 2007, and received the Humboldt Research Award in 2011.

Major publications

Books

References

External links 
 Curtis T McMullen at Harvard.
 
 

20th-century American mathematicians
21st-century American mathematicians
Fields Medalists
Topologists
Harvard University faculty
University of California, Berkeley College of Letters and Science faculty
Princeton University faculty
Institute for Advanced Study visiting scholars
Harvard University alumni
Williams College alumni
1958 births
Living people
Members of the United States National Academy of Sciences
Fellows of the American Mathematical Society
Dynamical systems theorists
Sloan Research Fellows
Mathematicians from California